Bangladesh participated in the 1990 Asian Games which were held in Beijing, China from September 22 to October 7, 1990.

Medalists

Football

Group D

 Bangladesh did not advance in next stage and ranked 13th.

Kabaddi

 Since both Pakistan and Bangladesh were tied on points, a play-off game was played to decide the 2nd team.

See also
 Bangladesh at the Asian Games
 Bangladesh at the Olympics

References

Nations at the 1990 Asian Games
1990
Asian Games